Streptomyces endophyticus is a bacterium species from the genus of Streptomyces which has been isolated from roots of the plant Artemisia annua L. in Kunming in the Yunnan province in China.

See also 
 List of Streptomyces species

References

Further reading

External links
Type strain of Streptomyces endophyticus at BacDive -  the Bacterial Diversity Metadatabase

endophyticus
Bacteria described in 2013